Mohammed Shehab (born 1976) is a former professional snooker player from the United Arab Emirates.

The winner of the Snooker Singles at the 2007 Asian Indoor Games, Shehab has enjoyed good form in the six-red variant format, most notably at the 2018 Six-red World Championship, where he reached the quarter-finals, defeating reigning World Champion Mark Williams in the last 16.

He competed as a professional on the main tour in the 1996–97 and 2006–07 seasons, finishing the latter with a ranking of 90th, the highest of his career.

Career
Having gained experience of competitive snooker at the 1995 World Amateur Championship, Shehab turned professional in 1996, for the 1996–97 season.

Main Tour
In his first season on the main tour, he entered nine tournaments, but his best performances came in the 1997 International Open and the European Open, where he reached the third qualifying round. Shehab had recorded his first professional win in the former, a 5–3 defeat of Englishman Rajan Sharma, but added only five more all season. Shebab would participate in the qualifying for both the 1996 UK Championship and the 1997 World Championship. His season's campaign culminated in a 1–5 loss to Iain Trimble in his second match. He finished the season ranked 397th and, with the addition of the secondary UK Tour, was immediately relegated from the main tour.

Shehab did not play again competitively for five years, until he entered the 2002 World Amateur Championship. There, he compensated for losses to Martin Gould and Alex Borg with victories over Habib Subah and seven others to progress from his group. He beat Supoj Saenla and Martin McCrudden to reach the quarter-finals, but lost 5–6 there to Steve Mifsud.

This led Shehab to enter several events on the Challenge Tour, which had replaced the UK Tour, during the 2003/2004 season; he lost in the semi-finals of one event to Stefan Mazrocis, but progressed no further after this. In Event Two, he defeated seventeen-year-old Mark Allen 4–3, but lost to Steve James in his next match. Shehab would also attempt to qualify for the world championship this season, but lose in the second round of qualifying to Lee Farebrother

Although he entered only one tournament in the following two seasons - losing 1–4 to Andrew Higginson in Event 1 of the 2004 Challenge Tour - Shehab won back his place on the main tour in 2006.

His second season as a professional brought no more success than his first, Shehab winning only four matches and earning only £500. He defeated Stuart Pettman, Liu Song and Borg in the 2006 Grand Prix, and Liu again in the Malta Cup, but lost his final four matches. Following a 6–10 loss to Mark Joyce in qualifying for the 2007 World Snooker Championship, Shehab finished the season ranked 90th, and was relegated once more from the tour.

Amateur career
Shehab would later win the Singles Snooker championship at the 2007 Asian Indoor Games. He defeated India's Yasin Merchant 4–2, Hong Kong's Chan Wai Ki 4–1, Thailand's Issara Kachaiwong 4–1, China's Xiao Guodong 4–3 before beating Thailand's James Wattana 4–3 in the final.

After playing as a wildcard entry in the 2009 Shanghai Masters, losing 3–5 to Graeme Dott, Shebab would contest the 2009 Six-red World Grand Prix, where he would come second in his group, defeating Joe Perry, and eventual winner Jimmy White, before defeating Nigel Bond in the first round. He would lose his second knockout round match to Judd Trump.

After 2009, Shehab continued to play at amateur level, entering the World Amateur Championship each year. His best performance came during the 2013 edition, when he reached the quarter-finals, where Lee Walker beat him 6–3. Shebab would make an appearance in the 2018 Six-red World Championship, where he would qualify from his group, thanks to wins over David Gilbert and Thanawat Tirapongpaiboon, and a 5–4 loss to Mark Selby. Shehab would draw world snooker champion Mark Williams in the last 16 knockout round. Shebab would win the match 6–3, and would play Sunny Akani in the Quarter-finals.

Performance and rankings timeline

Career finals

Pro-am finals: 1 (1 title)

Amateur finals: 3 (1 title)

References

External links
 Mohammed Shahab on Snooker Database

Living people
Cue sports players at the 1998 Asian Games
Cue sports players at the 2002 Asian Games
Cue sports players at the 2006 Asian Games
Cue sports players at the 2010 Asian Games
Emirati snooker players
1976 births
World Games bronze medalists
Competitors at the 2009 World Games
Asian Games competitors for the United Arab Emirates